John Arthur Ferejohn (born June 6, 1944) is an American legal scholar and political scientist. He is the Samuel Tilden Professor of Law at New York University School of Law, where he has been a full-time faculty member since 2009. He previously served as a professor of social science at the California Institute of Technology and as the Carolyn S. G. Munro Professor of Political Science at Stanford University. While teaching political science at Stanford, he was also a senior fellow at their Hoover Institution. He is a member of the American Academy of Arts and Sciences, the National Academy of Sciences, and received a Guggenheim Fellowship in 1981.

References

External links
Faculty page

Living people
American political scientists
American legal scholars
New York University School of Law faculty
California Institute of Technology alumni
Stanford University faculty
Hoover Institution people
California State University, Northridge alumni
Stanford University alumni
Fellows of the American Academy of Arts and Sciences
Members of the United States National Academy of Sciences
People from Deming, New Mexico
1944 births